The 2003 National Indoor Football League season was the third season of the National Indoor Football League (NIFL). The league champions were the Ohio Valley Greyhounds, who wrapped up a perfect season by defeating the Utah Warriors in Indoor Bowl III and becoming the first team in league history to win back-to-back titles.

Standings

 Green indicates clinched playoff berth
 Purple indicates division champion
 Grey indicates best conference record

Playoffs
Round 1
 Ohio Valley 51, Lexington 42
 Lake Charles 44, Houma 19
 Omaha 72, Bismarck 49
 Utah 68, Sioux Falls 55

Semifinals
 Ohio Valley 43, Lake Charles 41
 Utah 62, Omaha 51

Indoor Bowl III
 Ohio Valley 45, Utah 37

External links
 2003 NIFL season stats

National Indoor Football League seasons
National Indoor Football League Season, 2003